Renato Altissimo (4 October 1940 – 17 April 2015) was an Italian politician and minister.

Biography

He was born in Portogruaro, near Venice.

Altissimo was a member of the Italian Liberal Party (Partito Liberale Italiano; PLI), a small party which served as a junior partner in several governing coalitions.

A long time follower of party leader Valerio Zanone, Altissimo served as PLI's national secretary from 1986, succeeding Alfredo Biondi. He resigned in March 1993 after being accused of implication in a corruption scandal; he denied any wrongdoing.

Altissimo was also Health Minister in the governments of Francesco Cossiga I (1979–1980), Giovanni Spadolini I and II (1980–1981), and Amintore Fanfani V (1982–1983).  He served as Minister for Industry and Trade in the first government of Bettino Craxi (1983–1986).

References

1940 births
2015 deaths
Politicians from the Metropolitan City of Venice
Italian Liberal Party politicians
20th-century Italian politicians
Italian Ministers of Health
Government ministers of Italy
Members of the Chamber of Deputies (Italy)
Members of the Senate of the Republic (Italy)
People from Portogruaro
The Liberals (Italy) politicians
21st-century Italian politicians